is a Japanese retired sprinter. She competed in the 4 × 100 metres relay at the 1997 World Championships. She is the former Japanese record holder in the 100 metres (11.36 seconds), 200 metres (23.82 seconds) and 4 × 100 metres relay (44.41 seconds).

She is currently the head coach at the Fukushima University Track Club.

Personal bests

International competition

References

External links

1971 births
Living people
Japanese female sprinters
Sportspeople from Fukushima Prefecture
World Athletics Championships athletes for Japan